The Verde Rim springsnail, scientific name Pyrgulopsis glandulosa, is a species of small freshwater snail, an aquatic gastropod mollusk in the family Hydrobiidae. This species is endemic to the United States. The common name refers to the Verde River in Arizona.

References

Molluscs of the United States
Pyrgulopsis
Gastropods described in 1988
Taxonomy articles created by Polbot